David Jonathan Cullen (born 10 January 1973) is an English former professional footballer who made 126 appearances in the Football League in the 1990s and 2000s. A midfielder, he played League football for Doncaster Rovers, Hartlepool United, Sheffield United, Shrewsbury Town, Halifax Town, Peterborough United, Carlisle United and Darlington, and non-League football for a number of clubs in the north of England.

Life and career
Cullen was born in Bishop Auckland, County Durham, in 1973. He came through the youth system at Doncaster Rovers and made his senior debut on 11 May 1991, in the starting eleven for the last Fourth Division match of the 1990–91 season, away to Gillingham. Doncaster lost 2–0. Cullen turned professional in September 1991, and made a handful of first-team appearances in the first half of that season, but dropped out of contention. In 1992–93, he spent time on loan at Northern Premier League Premier Division club Bishop Auckland. After one more substitute appearance in August 1993, Doncaster released him and he joined another Northern Premier League club, Spennymoor United, where he spent three seasons before moving on to Morpeth Town of the Northern League.

In March 1997, Cullen returned to the Football League when Hartlepool United manager Mick Tait signed him from Morpeth for a fee of £1,000 and a significant sell-on clause. Under Tait's management, he emerged as what the Northern Echo called a cultured playmaker, and his developing goalscoring form in the 1997–98 season12 goals from 28 Third Division (fourth-tier) matchesearned him a move to First Division club Sheffield United. The club could not risk rejecting the £250,000 fee, of which £75,000 had to go to Morpeth, because he would have been able to leave at the end of the season for free under the Bosman ruling. Despite leaving both club and division in January, Cullen remained Hartlepool's top scorer for the season and was named in the Third Division Team of the Year.

Cullen did not reproduce his Hartlepool form at the higher level. He made just four substitute appearances in 18 months, and in the 1999–2000 season spent spells on loan to Shrewsbury Town and Halifax Town, both Third Division clubs, before joining Peterborough United for a £35,000 fee in March 2000. He played regularly for what remained of the season, helped his team reach the play-offs, and played well in the final as Peterborough beat Darlington 1–0 to gain promotion to the Second Division. He continued in the first team until injuries intervened, and after a cartilage operation he finished the season on loan at Carlisle United. Cullen was released at the end of the 2001–02 season, during which he made 17 appearances, and he signed a one-month contract with Third Division Darlington. After four matches, his deal was extended, but he was let go two weeks later, and he returned to his former club of Spennymoor.

A trial with Malaysian club Selangor in February yielded nothing, and Cullen made a brief return to another former club, Morpeth Town, before trying his luck equally fruitlessly in the United States with the Chicago Fire and the Long Island Rough Riders in March and April. He finished the season back at Morpeth, played seven Conference matches for Halifax Town at the start of the 2003–04 season, before another spell with Spennymoor, during which he scored a hat-trick of penalties. He then played Northern League football for Washington Nissan, Newcastle Blue Star, further spells with the renamed Sunderland Nissan and with Morpeth Town, and Horden Colliery Welfare.

Career statistics

Honours
Individual
PFA Team of the Year: 1997–98 Third Division

References

1973 births
Living people
Footballers from County Durham
English footballers
Association football midfielders
Doncaster Rovers F.C. players
Bishop Auckland F.C. players
Spennymoor United F.C. players
Morpeth Town A.F.C. players
Hartlepool United F.C. players
Sheffield United F.C. players
Shrewsbury Town F.C. players
Halifax Town A.F.C. players
Peterborough United F.C. players
Carlisle United F.C. players
Darlington F.C. players
Sunderland Nissan F.C. players
Newcastle Blue Star F.C. players
Darlington Town F.C. players
English Football League players
Northern Premier League players
Northern Football League players
National League (English football) players